Cecílio Lopes (born 18 March 1979) is a Cape Verdean international footballer who plays as a striker for Capelle in the Dutch Topklasse.

Career

Club career
Lopes formerly played for SBV Excelsior, FC Dordrecht, Sparta Rotterdam, FC Volendam and FC Zwolle.

International career
Despite being born in the Netherlands, Lopes is eligible to play for the Cape Verde national football team through his father. He received his first call up in May 2008.

References

External links
FIFA profile

 Player profile at Voetbal International

1979 births
Living people
Cape Verdean footballers
Cape Verde international footballers
Expatriate footballers in the Netherlands
SC Heerenveen players
Sparta Rotterdam players
FC Volendam players
Eredivisie players
Eerste Divisie players
Derde Divisie players
Footballers from Rotterdam
Dutch sportspeople of Cape Verdean descent
FC Dordrecht players
Cape Verdean people of Dutch descent
VV Capelle players
Association football midfielders

Dutch people of Cape Verdean descent